Anclote Key is an island off the Gulf Coast of the U.S. state of Florida, the largest island in the Anclote Keys, located at   near Tarpon Springs. Its name originates from the Spanish term for "anchor." The island is accessible only by boat and is split between Anclote Key Preserve State Park and Anclote National Wildlife Reserve. The island contains mangrove wetlands, coastal pine flatwoods, and beaches. A large number of shorebirds nest and breed on Anclote Key and the surrounding islands. Sand Key is located nearby. Most of the island is located within Pasco County, while its southernmost section is in Pinellas County. The island is home to the Anclote Keys Light.

References

Gulf Coast barrier islands of Florida
Islands of Pasco County, Florida
Islands of Pinellas County, Florida
Islands of Florida